Barrington Wade (born March 16, 1998) is an American football inside linebacker who is a free agent. He played college football at Iowa.

College career
Wade was a member of the Iowa Hawkeyes for five seasons, redshirting as a true freshman. He finished his collegiate career with 23 tackles, one sack, 1.5 tackles for loss and two interceptions in 33 games played.

Professional career

Baltimore Ravens
Wade signed with the Baltimore Ravens as an undrafted free agent on May 13, 2021. He was waived on August 6, 2021.

Denver Broncos
Wade was claimed off waivers by the Denver Broncos on August 7, 2021. He was waived during final roster cuts on August 31, 2021, but was signed to the team's practice squad the next day. Wade as signed to the Broncos' active roster on October 19, 2021. He was waived on October 25, and re-signed to the practice squad. He signed a reserve/future contract with the Broncos on January 10, 2022. He was waived on August 27, 2022.

References

External links
Iowa Hawkeyes bio
Denver Broncos bio

1998 births
Living people
American football linebackers
Denver Broncos players
Iowa Hawkeyes football players
Players of American football from Illinois
Baltimore Ravens players
People from Skokie, Illinois